Piazza Statuto is a city square in Turin, Italy.

Buildings around the square

Fréjus Rail Tunnel
Torre BBPR

Piazzas in Turin